The Shacha is a river in Kostroma Oblast, Russia. It is a left tributary of the Kostroma River.

References 

Rivers of Kostroma Oblast